Attorney General Campbell may refer to:

Bonnie Campbell (politician) (born 1948), Attorney General of Iowa
James Campbell (postmaster general) (1812–1893), Attorney-General of Pennsylvania
James Campbell, 1st Baron Glenavy (1851–1931), Attorney-General for Ireland
John Campbell, 1st Baron Campbell (1779–1861), Attorney General for England and Wales
Kim Campbell (born 1947), Attorney General of Canada

See also
General Campbell (disambiguation)